Gowzluy-e Sofla (also Romanized as Gowzlūy-e Soflá; also known as Gowzlū-ye Soflá) is a village in Ajorluy-ye Gharbi Rural District, Baruq District, Miandoab County, West Azerbaijan Province, Iran. At the 2006 census, its population was 49, in 10 families.

References 

Populated places in Miandoab County